Leiningerland is a Verbandsgemeinde ("collective municipality") in the district of Bad Dürkheim, in Rhineland-Palatinate, Germany. The seat of the Verbandsgemeinde is in Grünstadt, which is not part of the Verbandsgemeinde. It was formed on 1 January 2018 by the merger of the former Verbandsgemeinden Grünstadt-Land and Hettenleidelheim. It takes its name from the historic area Leiningerland.

The Verbandsgemeinde Leiningerland consists of the following Ortsgemeinden ("local municipalities"):

Altleiningen 
Battenberg 
Bissersheim 
Bockenheim an der Weinstraße 
Carlsberg 
Dirmstein 
Ebertsheim 
Gerolsheim 
Großkarlbach
Hettenleidelheim 
Kindenheim 
Kirchheim an der Weinstraße 
Kleinkarlbach 
Laumersheim 
Mertesheim 
Neuleiningen
Obersülzen 
Obrigheim 
Quirnheim 
Tiefenthal 
Wattenheim 

Verbandsgemeinde in Rhineland-Palatinate